Cornelian (usually spelled "carnelian") is a reddish-brown variety of the mineral chalcedony.

Cornelian may also refer to:
 Cornelian automobile, a 1914 racing vehicle
 Cornelian Bay (disambiguation), multiple places
 Cornelian dilemma, a dilemma named after dramatist Pierre Corneille
 Cornelia (gens), an important gens in ancient Rome
 Deudorix epijarbas, an Asian butterfly
 A variety of plants in the dogwood family including
 Cornus florida
 Cornelian cherry
 Japanese cornelian cherry